Richard W. "Rick" Stephenson (born 1955 or 1956 in Yuba City) is an American bodybuilder and former United States Army Ranger.

Biography 
He was involved sports since his youngest years and was a high school wrestler. He started to work out as a 14-year-old. After high school he enlisted to the military and was promptly sent to West Germany. In 1979, he was accepted to the San Diego Mesa College, where he majored in aviation occupations.

He never finished college but in the meantime was selected for the United States Army Rangers—a special operations unit of the United States Armed Forces. He graduated from the Fort Benning military school for special forces soldiers, and considers years of torturous trainings at the camp the most rewarding times of his life, admitting: "Your body can stand ten times more than you think it can."

Stephenson's bodybuilding debut was the Gold's Classic in Los Angeles, organized by the National Physique Committee (NPC), where he placed second in the light-heavyweight category.

Stephenson was featured on the front page of Muscular Development in May 1989.

He lives in San Diego, California, with his Swedish-born wife Agnetha Stephenson, née Roca, whom he married in the 1980s. He has five sons: Erik, Niklas, Mattius, Alek, and Derrik. Erik (b. 1992) is a soccer player and Niklas is a professional baseball player. Stephenson is a co-founder of the TG Gym San Diego.

Bodybuilding titles 
 1981: Gold's Classic – NPC, Light-HeavyWeight, 2nd
 1981: Nationals – NPC, Light-HeavyWeight, 11th
 1985: USA Championships – NPC, Light-HeavyWeight, 4th
 1987: California Championships – NPC, 2nd
 1988: California Championships – NPC, HeavyWeight, 1st
 1988: California Championships – NPC, Overall Winner
 1989: USA Championships – NPC, HeavyWeight, 3rd
 1990: Nationals – NPC, HeavyWeight, 4th

References

External links 
 Rick Stephenson's profile at MuscleMemory.com
 Gallery of Rick Stephenson's photographs

1950s births
American bodybuilders
Living people
People associated with physical culture
People from Yuba City, California
Sportspeople from San Diego
United States Army Rangers